Karen Allison is an American and Canadian bridge player and frequent Vugraph commentator.

Allison was taught to play bridge by her parents.

Allison is originally from New York and moved to Canada in 1973, however was still eligible to represent USA and did so in 1974 playing with Sally Johnson. 
Allison lived in Canada from 1973 to 1983 and registered to play for Canada. She won two Open Canadian team trials becoming the first women to represent Canada in an Open Team World Championship. She later won the Women's team trials playing for Valkenberg. Allison was on the board for the Canadian Bridge Federation (CBF) during her time in Canada.

Allison moved back to USA in 1983.

Allison worked on the Laws Commissions and is an editor for several versions of the Bridge Laws.

Allison was the first to report on a World Championship over VuGraph in 1994.

Bridge accomplishments

Wins

 North American Bridge Championships (5)
 Machlin Women's Swiss Teams (1) 2004 
 Chicago Mixed Board-a-Match (1) 1983 
 Truscott Senior Swiss Teams (1) 2009 
 Wagar Women's Knockout Teams (2) 1969, 2004

Runners-up

 World Women Knockout Teams Championship (McConnell Cup) (1) 1994
 North American Bridge Championships (8)
 Keohane North American Swiss Teams (1) 1995 
 Machlin Women's Swiss Teams (2) 2002, 2005 
 Sternberg Women's Board-a-Match Teams (3) 1986, 1992, 2004 
 Smith Life Master Women's Pairs (1) 1969 
 Wagar Women's Knockout Teams (1) 1981

References

External links
 

American contract bridge players
Canadian contract bridge players
Living people
Year of birth missing (living people)